John Russell (8 April 1887 — 20 June 1965) was a Scottish first-class cricketer.

Russell was born in April 1887 at Liff, Angus. He was educated at the High School of Dundee. A club cricketer for both Perthshire and Forfarshire, he made a single appearance in first-class cricket for Scotland against Middlesex at Edinburgh in 1923. Described as a "hefty, broad shouldered" batsman, Russell batted twice in the match and was dismissed for 29 runs in the Scotland first innings by J. W. Hearne, while in their second innings he was dismissed for 29 runs by Archie Fowler. Outside of cricket, he was by profession a wine and spirits merchant. Russell died at Dundee in June 1965.

References

External links
 

1887 births
1965 deaths
Sportspeople from Angus, Scotland
People educated at the High School of Dundee
Scottish cricketers
Scottish merchants
Wine merchants